Persoonia mollis, commonly known as soft geebung, is a plant in the family Proteaceae and is endemic to New South Wales.

Description

Taxonomy
Persoonia mollis was first formally described in 1810 by Robert Brown in Transactions of the Linnean Society of London.

In 1991, Siegfried Krauss and Lawrie Johnson described nine subspecies of P. mollis in the journal Telopea, and the names are accepted by the Australian Plant Census:
 Persoonia mollis subsp. caleyi (R.Br.)
 Persoonia mollis subsp. ledifolia (A.Cunn. ex Meisn.)

Distribution and habitat
Soft geebung grows from heath to forest, usually on sandstone, from the Blue Mountains and Hawkesbury River south to the Clyde River.
 Subspecies budawangensis grows from woodland to forest and is endemic to the Budawang Range;
 Subspecies caleyi grows in forest between Jervis Bay and Durras Lake on the South Coast;
 Subspecies ledifolia occurs between Kangaloon, the Shoalhaven River, Jamberoo and Wingello where it grows from heath to forest on Hawkesbury Sandstone;
 Subspecies leptophylla is found between the Shoalhaven River, Budawang Range, Nerriga and Nowra and on the Beecroft Peninsula where it grows in heath and forest on Nowra and Conjola sandstones;
 Subspecies livens is found between Penrose, Goulburn and Braidwood, growing in woodland on metasedimentary rock and conglomerate;
 Subspecies maxima grows in forest on Hawkesbury sandstone in the Cowan-Hornsby area;
 Subspecies mollis is found in forest on sandstone in the Blue Mountains;
 Subspecies nectens occurs between Oakdale, Hill Top and the Illawarra Escarpment where it grows in forest;
 Subspecies revoluta grows in forest on Hawkesbury sandstone between Nattai Gorge, Bullio, Berrima and Canyonleigh.

References

mollis
Flora of New South Wales
Proteales of Australia
Plants described in 1810
Taxa named by Robert Brown (botanist, born 1773)